The Adler Arena Trade And Exhibition Center (Адлер-Арена) is an 8,000-seat speed skating oval in the Olympic Park, Sochi, Russia. It opened in 2012 and looks like an iceberg or ice fault. The center hosted the speed skating events at the 2014 Winter Olympics. Original plans for after the Olympics were for the Adler Arena to be turned into an exhibition center.

It cost $32.8 million to build the venue, including the temporary works for the Olympics. Before the Olympics it hosted the 2013 Russian Speed Skating Championships in December 2012 and the 2013 World Single Distance Speed Skating Championships from 21 to 24 March 2013.

Construction
A crystal face theme is supported by angular walls and triangular stained-glass windows. The gray and white color of the building enhances this impression. The walls along the sides of the skating rink are made transparent so that spectators can look outside. The skating center is designed to make the utmost use of local natural features.

Track records

Men

Women

Source: www.speedskatingnews.info

Other uses
The skating centre hosted the 2014 World Robot Olympiad. Russia hosted their 2015 Fed Cup World Group semifinals tie at the Adler Arena.

See also
 List of indoor arenas in Russia

References

External links

 Adler Arena on  www.speedskatingnews.info

Indoor arenas in Russia
Olympic speed skating venues
Indoor speed skating venues
Sport in Sochi
Venues of the 2014 Winter Olympics
Speed skating venues in Russia
Adlersky City District
Buildings and structures in Sochi